Old Islam in Detroit: Rediscovering the Muslim American Past is a 2014 book by Sally Howell, published by the Oxford University Press. It discusses the Muslims of early 20th century Detroit, Michigan, and Detroit prior to 1970.

Contents

The first parts of the book discusses the first Muslims to settle Detroit and the city's the first Islamic religious facility, the Highland Park Mosque. Another chapter discusses the second mosque, Universal Islamic Society (UIS). The later chapters discuss Islamic leaders who originated from Detroit and the first mosques to open in Dearborn. At the end of the book Howell states that pre-1980s views of Muslims influences views of Islam held by Americans in the post-September 11 environment.

The book includes interviews of the original Muslims and their families.

Reception
Dawn-Marie Gibson of Royal Holloway, University of London stated that the book was "thoroughly researched" and is "a valuable contribution to scholarship on American Islam."

B. D. Singleton rated the book two stars, and stated that the book "is appropriate for all academic libraries" and is "nicely illustrated but would have been strengthened by a basic chronology."

See also
 Islam in Metro Detroit

References
 Gibson, Dawn-Marie (Royal Holloway, University of London). "Old Islam in Detroit: Rediscovering the Muslim American Past." (Book review). Journal of American History, 2015, Vol.102(1), pp. 205–207. DOI 10.1093/jahist/jav220.
 Singleton, B.D. (California State University, San Bernardino). "Howell, Sally. Old Islam in Detroit: rediscovering the Muslim American past." (Brief article)(Book review) CHOICE: Current Reviews for Academic Libraries, 2015, Vol.52(5), p. 877(1).

Notes

2014 non-fiction books
History books about Islam
Islam in Metro Detroit
History of Detroit
Books about Detroit
Oxford University Press books